Nevi Gebreselasie is an Eritrean footballer who last played for Adelaide Cobras.

Club career
In 2011, he signed with FFSA Super League club Western Strikers after being granted refugee status by the Australian government. He later signed for FFSA Premier League side White City Woodville scoring 3 goals in 5 games.

International career
He played in the 2009 CECAFA Cup in Kenya, appearing in the 2–1 group match defeat to Rwanda.

Personal life

Whilst competing in the 2009 CECAFA Cup in Kenya he was part of the Eritrea national football team which failed to return home after competing in the regional tournament in Nairobi. After receiving political asylum from the Australian government, the team moved to Adelaide, Australia.

References

Living people
Eritrean footballers
Eritrea international footballers
Association football defenders
Year of birth missing (living people)
Western Strikers SC players
FK Beograd (Australia) players
Adelaide Cobras FC players
Adelaide Olympic FC players
Northern Demons SC players
FFSA Super League players
Eritrean expatriate footballers
Expatriate soccer players in Australia
Eritrean refugees